Ballao, (Ballau in the Sardinian language), is a comune (municipality) in the Province of South Sardinia in the Italian region Sardinia, located about  northeast of Cagliari, in the Gerrei traditional subregion.

It was founded around 1300, when the inhabitants of the ancient hill village of Nuraxi moved  in the nearby plain, nearer to the Flumendosa river, to improve their agricultural output. It is home to the Funtana Coberta, a Bronze Age archaeological site.

Ballao borders the following municipalities: Armungia, Escalaplano, Goni, Perdasdefogu, San Nicolò Gerrei, Silius, Villaputzu.

References

External links 

Official website

Cities and towns in Sardinia